Bojana Milošević (Serbian Cyrillic: Бојана Милошевић, 29 November 1965 – 16 April 2020) was a Serbian basketball player. She competed for Yugoslavia in the 1988 Summer Olympics. 

Milošević died in April 2020 in Belgrade, Serbia.

References

1965 births
2020 deaths
Centers (basketball)
Yugoslav women's basketball players
Serbian women's basketball players
Olympic basketball players of Yugoslavia
Basketball players at the 1988 Summer Olympics
Olympic silver medalists for Yugoslavia
Olympic medalists in basketball
ŽKK Crvena zvezda players
ŽKK Voždovac players
Medalists at the 1988 Summer Olympics
Universiade medalists in basketball
Universiade gold medalists for Yugoslavia
Universiade bronze medalists for Yugoslavia
Sportspeople from Kraljevo
Serbian expatriate basketball people in Greece
Serbian expatriate basketball people in Italy
Medalists at the 1985 Summer Universiade
Medalists at the 1987 Summer Universiade